Tiago Kadú Correa Girrulat (born August 28, 1981, in Santiago de Chile, Chile), is a Chilean actor of films and telenovelas.

Biography 
The son of a Chilean father and Brazilian mother, Tiago was born in Chile, but at a year of age went to Santa Catarina, in the South of Brazil with his parents and his sister Itaci, where he remained until age eight.

In 2010 he married Ignacia Allamand, also an actress, with whom he has shared the screen in the soap operas Vivir con 10 (2007), Mala Conducta (2008) and Infiltradas of Chilevisión.

Filmography

Theater Plays

References

External links 

1981 births
Living people
Male actors from Santiago
Chilean people of Brazilian descent
Chilean male film actors
Chilean male telenovela actors
Chilean male television actors
21st-century Chilean male actors